Jada-e Maiwand or Jadah-i Maiwand (Maiwand Road) is a major thoroughfare in the old center of Kabul, Afghanistan. The wide boulevard was built around 1948 as a modern main road cutting through the cluttered ancient alleyways. Although Kabul city has widely expanded since then, Jada-e Maiwand continues to be a go-to shopping place for many residents, for it has anything the city has and links to plenty of old bazaars and markets, such as Mandawi and Ka Foroshi (Bird Market).

Name
The avenue is named after the 1880 Battle of Maiwand, when the Afghans were victorious over the British in the Second Anglo-Afghan War. A victory monument was built at a circle in Maiwand Road in 1959.

History

Maiwand Road was almost completely destroyed by 1994 due to the Civil War, being one of the worst damaged areas. Since the 2000s it has been rebuilt and become a busy commercial district once again.

War memorial
The Minaret of the Unknown Corps commemorates the Afghan lives that were lost in the battle of 1880. It is named as such because the identities of many of the martyrs remained unknown. The blue minaret was built in the middle of the circle on Maiwand Road. The memorial was destroyed during the Battle of Kabul (1992-96). It was rebuilt by 2005.

References 

Streets in Kabul